Madison Emiko Love is an American singer and songwriter. She is signed to Artist Publishing Group.

Early life
Madison Emiko Love was born and raised in Los Angeles, California. Her father, Roger Love, is a vocal coach. Love moved to New York and started her career writing songs while attending the Clive Davis Institute of Recorded Music at New York University Tisch School of the Arts, where she later graduated. In 2014, Love was featured in the Teen Vogue series, Bryanboy Goes to College.

Career

Writing credits
Love co-wrote the 2016 song "Bad Things" by Machine Gun Kelly and Camila Cabello, while she was a student at New York University (NYU). Love also co-wrote the 2017 song "Him & I", by G-Eazy and Halsey. "Him & I" peaked at number one on the Billboard Pop Songs Airplay Chart in 2018. Love's first executive produced song was Ava Max's 2018 song "Sweet but Psycho", the latter artist coincidentally collaborated with Love during their time in college and were also friends. The song reached number one in 17 countries including Germany and the United Kingdom, a position it held on the UK Singles Chart for four consecutive weeks.

Vocal credits
As a vocalist, Love was featured alongside G-Eazy on the track "Mama Always Told Me", "Hurt People" by Two Feet, "No Filter" by Black Coast, "Waiting For You" by Coyote Kisses, and "I Love You" by Axwell & Ingrosso.

Discography

Writing

Vocals

Filmography

References

External links

New York University alumni
Tisch School of the Arts alumni
Living people
American women singer-songwriters
1995 births
Musicians from Los Angeles
American people of Japanese descent
20th-century American Jews
21st-century American Jews
Singer-songwriters from California